The 2012–13 Serbian Hockey League season was the 22nd season of the Serbian Hockey League, the top level of ice hockey in Serbia. Six teams participated in the league, and HK Partizan won the championship.

Regular season

References

External links
 Season on eurohockey.com
 

Ser